Genevieve Mary Lloyd (born 16 October 1941 at Cootamundra, New South Wales), is an Australian philosopher and feminist.

Biography
Lloyd studied philosophy at the University of Sydney in the early 1960s and then at Somerville College, Oxford. Her D.Phil, awarded in 1973, was on "Time and Tense". From 1967 until 1987 she lectured at the Australian National University, during which period she developed her most influential ideas and wrote The Man of Reason, which was published in 1984. In 1987 she was appointed to the chair of philosophy at the University of New South Wales, being the first female professor of philosophy appointed in Australia. On retirement, she was appointed Professor Emerita.

Bibliography

Books

Chapters in books

References

External links
 Help Sheet on Genevieve Lloyd
 Women of Philosophy, Stirring Up The Pot Report of talk
 Waking Sleeping Beauty Honours thesis discussing Lloyd on Descartes 
 

1941 births
Living people
Australian non-fiction writers
Alumni of Somerville College, Oxford
University of Sydney alumni
Academic staff of the Australian National University
Academic staff of the University of New South Wales
Australian women philosophers
Feminist philosophers
20th-century Australian philosophers
21st-century Australian philosophers
Australian feminist writers
Spinoza scholars